Marie-Alice Dumont (October 10, 1892 – 1985) was a Canadian photographer living in Quebec. She is thought to be the first professional woman photographer in eastern Quebec.

She was born in Saint-Alexandre-de-Kamouraska and learned photography from her brother Abbé Napoléon Dumont. Dumont later studied with a professional photographer Ulric Lavoie from Rivière-du-Loup. In 1925, she opened a commercial photography studio in her home town. Dumont photographed people and landscapes of the Kamouraska region. She closed her studio in 1960 due to illness.

She died in Saint-Alexandre at the age of 92.

Dumont donated about 10,000 negatives to the Musée du Bas-Saint-Laurent shortly before her death. The museum has since held several exhibitions of her work.

References 

1892 births
1985 deaths
Canadian women photographers
Artists from Quebec
Kamouraska Regional County Municipality
20th-century Canadian women artists
20th-century Canadian photographers
20th-century women photographers